Benjamin Cook Cubbage (October 1, 1895 – May 7, 1961) was an American football player and coach of football and basketball.  He served as the head football coach Virginia Agricultural and Mechanical College and Polytechnic Institute (VPI)—now known as Virginia Tech—from 1921 to 1925, compiled a record  of 30–12–6.  Cubbage was also the head basketball coach at VPI for one season, in 1923–24, tallying a mark of 5–13.

After graduating from Central High School in Philadelphia, Cubbage played college football at Pennsylvania State University as an end and tackle.  He played professionally as a guard for the Massillon Tigers of the "Ohio League" during the team's 1919 season.

Head coaching record

Football

References

External links
 

1895 births
1961 deaths
American football ends
American football guards
American football tackles
Basketball coaches from Pennsylvania
Massillon Tigers players
Penn State Nittany Lions football players
Sewanee Tigers football coaches
Virginia Tech Hokies football coaches
Virginia Tech Hokies men's basketball coaches
Sportspeople from Philadelphia
Players of American football from Philadelphia